Krzysztof Kubica (born 25 May 2000) is a Polish professional footballer who plays as a midfielder for Italian club Benevento.

Career
On 29 August 2022, Serie B side Benevento announced the signing of Kubica for an undisclosed fee.

Honours
Individual
Ekstraklasa Young Player of the Month: August 2021, May 2022

Career statistics

References

External links
 
 

2000 births
Living people
People from Żywiec
Association football midfielders
Polish footballers
Poland youth international footballers
Poland under-21 international footballers
Ekstraklasa players
I liga players
III liga players
Serie B players
Górnik Zabrze players
Chrobry Głogów players
Benevento Calcio players
Polish expatriate footballers
Expatriate footballers in Italy
Polish expatriate sportspeople in Italy